Leslie Melvin Prior (30 March 1908 – 8 September 1972) was an Australian rules footballer who played with Fitzroy in the Victorian Football League (VFL).

Notes

External links 

1908 births
1972 deaths
Australian rules footballers from Victoria (Australia)
Fitzroy Football Club players